J is a 2014 novel by Howard Jacobson. It was shortlisted for the 2014 Man Booker Prize.

References

2014 British novels
2014 science fiction novels
Jonathan Cape books